Inuit weapons were primarily hunting tools which served a dual purpose as weapons, whether against other Inuit groups or against their traditional enemies, the Chipewyan, Tłı̨chǫ (Dogrib), Dene, and Cree.

The bows carried by the Inuit were distinctive in that some were cable-backed bows, where the tensile strength of the bow was supplemented by wrapped cord.

Weapons
War harpoon
War club
Throwing spear
Cable-backed bow
Bolas
Toggling harpoon
Kakivak
Ulu
Snow knife
Inuit axe
Inuit Crossbow

References

 
Inuit culture
 
Ancient weapons
Inuit tools